Julie Caroline Van Keulen (née Dowling), BEM (born 7 December 1959) is an Australian Paralympic athlete.

Biography
Born in Tasmania, Dowling had a car accident as a teenager that left her paraplegic. Her first national competition was the 1981 National Para Quad Games, where she won three gold medals and broke three Australian records in javelin, shot put and discus. She then competed at the 1982 FESPIC Games, where she won three gold medals at the same events, breaking a world record in the javelin. At the 1983 Stoke Mandeville Games, she won a gold medal in the javelin with yet another world record, a silver medal in the discus and a bronze medal in the shot put. At the 1984 New York/Stoke Mandeville Paralympics, she won a gold medal in the Women's Javelin 4 event, breaking a Paralympic record. She also finished fourth in the Women's Shot Put and Women's Discus. She retired from competition after the games.

Recognition
After the 1984 games, Dowling won three Mercury W.D. & H.O. Wills Star  of Sport awards, a Sport Australia Award, a national Para Quad trophy for the best female athlete in international events, and a TAS TV Sportswoman of the Year Award. She received a British Empire Medal in 1985. In 2005, she was inducted into the Tasmanian Sporting Hall of Fame.

References

External links
Julie Dowling – Athletics Australia Results

Paralympic athletes of Australia
Athletes (track and field) at the 1984 Summer Paralympics
Medalists at the 1984 Summer Paralympics
Paralympic gold medalists for Australia
Paralympic medalists in athletics (track and field)
Wheelchair javelin throwers
People with paraplegia
Sportswomen from Tasmania
Recipients of the British Empire Medal
1959 births
Living people
Australian female javelin throwers
Paralympic javelin throwers